Wortzel is a surname. Notable people with the surname include:

 Adrianne Wortzel (born 1941), American contemporary artist
 Larry Wortzel (born 1947), U.S. Army scholar